"Caught Up" is a song by American singer Usher. It was written by Ryan Toby, Andre Harris, Vidal Davis and Jason Boyd, and produced by Dre & Vidal for Usher's 2004 album, Confessions. The song was released as the fifth and final single from the album on January 3, 2005. The single peaked at number eight in the United States, the only single released from Confessions without topping the Billboard Hot 100, and number nine on in the United Kingdom. "Caught Up" also reached the top 20 in Australia, Finland, Ireland, the Netherlands, and New Zealand. It received positive reviews from contemporary critics.

Background and release
Although Usher "didn't look too far" when starting working on his fourth studio album Confessions and decided to "continue building" with previous producers, he branched out with several musical collaborators. Usher enlisted Philadelphia producers Andre "Dre" Harris and Vidal Davis of Dre & Vidal, along with other musical collaborators. During the sessions, Usher asked them to create a "real up-tempo beat". When they worked on the track, they partied the whole time which Dre considered a "partly record". He recalled, "We had some women, some drinks, some music." After Dre created the beat, they decided to "make sure the mood was inspiring during recording." They went to club to take a break, and played the song in Usher's truck while on the way. Usher felt the collaboration was pleasing, seeing other people responded positively to the song.

"Caught Up" was the fifth and final single from Confessions. The song impacted US rhythmic contemporary and urban radio on January 3, 2005, and it was added to contemporary hit radio on January 11, 2005, alongside a remix featuring rapper Fabolous. It was also released in the Netherlands and the United Kingdom on February 21, 2005, and on March 8 in Germany. The Germany release contains the album version of the song, three of its remixes and the single's music video.

Reception

"Caught Up" received positive reviews from contemporary critics. Andrew McGregor of BBC called the song "meaty" and "hip-grinding". Jon Caramanica of Blender magazine referred to the song like a "Southern marching band performing late-'80s R&B". He characterized Usher's voice playing like a rhythm instruments. Sal Cinquemani of Slant Magazine complimented Dre and Vidal for producing an old-sounding music without sampling records, calling it "super-tight" alongside "Follow Me", another song from the album. Andy Kellman of Allmusic complimented the song as one of Usher's best moments in the album, together with "Burn". Kelefa Sanneh of The New York Times called it a "thunderous song" from the album, adding that it gave Usher "a chance to do two of the things he does best: strut and pander".

Chart performance 
"Caught Up" did not live up to the chart-topping performances of Confessions previous four releases. In the United States, the single debuted on the Billboard Hot 100 at number 76. It peaked at number eight for two non-consecutive weeks, 15 weeks after its release. "Caught Up" was the only single to not top the Hot 100 compared to the album's four previous releases. The single stayed on the Hot 100 for 27 weeks.

Outside the United States, responses from music markets were relatively similar. "Caught Up" debuted and peaked at number nine on the United Kingdom, remaining on the chart for also nine weeks. It reached number 10 in the Netherlands and under top ten on the rest of European countries; much lesser in Finland where it only stayed for one week compared to other charts, remaining for several weeks. In Australia and New Zealand, the single reached numbers 15 and 12, respectively.

 Music video 
The music video for "Caught Up" was directed by Mr. X, who was behind the laser light treatment of Usher's 2004 video "Yeah!". The video shows Usher and friends riding a car while heading to his live performance. On the way, they fist fight after Usher saves a woman from an antagonist. Usher realizes he is supposed to perform, and finally goes to the venue. The video ends with Usher performing the song in front of a large crowd. The music video debuted on MTV's Total Request Live on January 10, 2005, at number 10. The video remained on the countdown for thirty-four days.

 Track listing Germany CD single'
 "Caught Up" (album version) – 3:48  
 "Caught Up" (official remix) (featuring Fabolous) – 4:39 
 "Caught Up" (Bimbo Jones remix) – 3:33 
 "Caught Up" (Delinquent "Whistle Crew" re-fix) – 7:56 
 "Caught Up" (music video) – 3:49

Charts

Weekly charts

Year-end charts

Certifications

References

Usher (musician) songs
2005 singles
2004 songs
Arista Records singles
Music videos directed by Director X
Song recordings produced by Dre & Vidal
Songs written by Andre Harris
Songs written by Poo Bear
Songs written by Ryan Toby
Songs written by Vidal Davis